Isca Yacu, located in northern Argentina, is a town in Jiménez Department, Santiago del Estero Province. Population (2010) 87. Postal code 4184.

Populated places in Santiago del Estero Province
Cities in Argentina
Argentina
Santiago del Estero Province